Percy Lancaster (1878, Manchester,–1951) was an English landscape artist.

Following some initial training as an architect, he attended Southport School of Art and developed his career as an artist.

References

1878 births
1951 deaths